Clean is the second full-length studio album by the experimental Australian group Severed Heads, released in 1981 through Dogfood Productions and Terse Tapes, two labels that the band themselves operated. Originally released on vinyl and cassette formats, both of which contained unique artwork and were released in small quantities, the vinyl in particular only being released as an edition of 400. Ellard reissued it on CD-R in 2005 on his own Sevcom label, with the order shuffled, the song "Food City" removed, and bonus tracks. In 2020, the album was reissued on LP by Dark Entries in its original form, with a second LP featuring 14 bonus songs, five of which had never been released before, culled from live performances, the Side 3 cassette and a Clean demo tape that only resurfaced in 2019. It was also made available digitally on Bandcamp.

Track listing

2020 Dark Entries reissue 2nd LP

Release history

References

External links
 

Severed Heads albums
1981 albums